Richard D. James (born 1952) is a mechanician and materials scientist. He is currently the Russell J. Penrose Professor and Distinguished McKnight University Professor at the Department of Aerospace Engineering and Mechanics at the University of Minnesota. He was educated at Brown University and received his PhD from Johns Hopkins University under the direction of J.L. Ericksen.

James is known for his research in phase transitions.  He has received several awards, including the Alexander von Humboldt Senior Research Award and the William Prager Medal. More recently, the ASME awarded him the Koiter Medal for "..pioneering the modern vision of phase transformations and materials instabilities in solids, explaining how microstructures form and evolve, and demonstrating how to take advantage of this to design new active materials".

With John M. Ball, he has served as one of the chief editors of the Archive for Rational Mechanics and Analysis.

External links
 Faculty page at the University of Minnesota.
 https://files.asme.org/Divisions/AMD/16261.pdf

References 

Living people
American materials scientists
1952 births
Brown University alumni
Johns Hopkins University alumni